Village of the Damned is a soundtrack by John Carpenter and Dave Davies for the 1995 film of the same name. It was released in 1995 through Varèse Sarabande.

Track listing

Personnel
 John Carpenter – synthesizer, bass
 Dave Davies – acoustic guitars, electric guitars
 Bruce Robb – Hammond B-3 organ, music supervisor, production
 Paul Mirkovich – synthesizer, orchestra conductor
 Mark Hamill – voice over on "March of the Children"
 Charles Everett – concert master
 Robert Townson – executive producer
 Matthew Ellard – assistant engineer

Orchestra
 Xiao N. He
 Eun-Mee Ahn
 Michael P. Harrison
 Helaine Wittenber
 Miriam A. Mayer
 Glenn Grab
 Karl Vincent-Wickliff

References

Sources

 

John Carpenter soundtracks
1995 soundtrack albums
Horror film soundtracks
Film scores
Varèse Sarabande soundtracks
Science fiction film soundtracks